Athenion is a personal name used in ancient Greece. In history it may refer to:

 Athenion of Maroneia, 4th-century BC Thracian painter
 Athenion (general), 1st-century BC commander employed by Cleopatra
 Athenion, a peripatetic philosopher and failed revolutionary often confused with Aristion
 Athenion (rebel), leader in the Second Servile War (104–100 BC)